A Wonderful World is the seventh studio album by Scottish singer Susan Boyle. It was released on 4 November 2016 by Syco Music and Columbia Records.

Following the release of her previous album, Hope in 2014, Susan Boyle took a break during 2015 to "take a little me time and spend time at home with family and friends", and thus the recording of her seventh studio album was postponed to 2016. In October 2016, Susan Boyle announced the release of A Wonderful World. Boyle said of the album: "I wanted to create an album that families could enjoy, something for everyone, an album that can be played all year and evoke memories. Anyone who knows me knows I’m a huge Madonna fan and to be able to perform ‘Like A Prayer’ was a real highlight". The album features a "virtual duet" with late singer Nat King Cole.

Commercial performance
The album debuted at number 150 on the Billboard 200 in the United States, with first-week sales of 5,000 units. In the United Kingdom, A Wonderful World debuted at number 22 on the UK Albums Chart, selling 15,013 copies and becoming Susan Boyle's lowest-charting album in the UK.

Track listing

Charts

Certifications

Release history

References

Susan Boyle albums
2016 albums
Syco Music albums
Columbia Records albums